Maryland's Legislative District 11 is one of 47 districts in the state for the Maryland General Assembly. It covers part of Baltimore County.

Demographic characteristics
As of the 2020 United States census, the district had a population of 127,808, of whom 99,934 (78.2%) were of voting age. The racial makeup of the district was 68,981 (54.0%) White, 36,640 (28.7%) African American, 416 (0.3%) Native American, 9,434 (7.4%) Asian, 22 (0.0%) Pacific Islander, 5,042 (3.9%) from some other race, and 7,242 (5.7%) from two or more races. Hispanic or Latino of any race were 9,335 (7.3%) of the population.

The district had 86,284 registered voters as of October 17, 2020, of whom 14,542 (16.9%) were registered as unaffiliated, 18,171 (21.1%) were registered as Republicans, 52,312 (60.6%) were registered as Democrats, and 805 (0.9%) were registered to other parties.

Political representation
The district is represented for the 2023–2027 legislative term in the State Senate by Shelly L. Hettleman (D) and in the House of Delegates by Cheryl Pasteur (D, District 11A), Jon S. Cardin (D, District 11B) and Dana M. Stein (D, District 11B).

References

Baltimore County, Maryland
11
11